Pac-Man World 3 is a platform video game developed by Namco Hometek and Blitz Games and published by Namco for the PlayStation 2, GameCube, Xbox, PlayStation Portable, Nintendo DS, and Microsoft Windows. The Nintendo DS version was ported by Human Soft. Released in 2005, it is the third and final installment in the Pac-Man World trilogy and the only one to not be released in Japan. It also features a speaking Pac-Man for the first time ever outside of the cartoon series.

Plot
In a search for power, a short evil genius called Erwin has found a way to suck raw energy out of the world of the Ghosts (the Spectral Realm). He has created a syphon that can penetrate into the Spectral Realm. This is causing the Spectral Realm to collapse into the real world (Pac-Land), bringing about an environmental catastrophe. Meanwhile, Pac-Man is celebrating his 25th birthday with his family when he is teleported by Orson, a former nemesis of Pac-Man from the original Pac-Man World. Orson communicates to him and tells him about the Spectral Realm (after Pac-Man complains to Orson about messing up his party and throwing him into a trash pit). Pac-Man is attacked by fiery Spectral monsters of the orange, green, and purple varieties which have been driven mad by Erwin's hypnosis with Inky and Blinky (Clyde) have been kidnapped as part of Erwin's evil scheme, but Pinky and Clyde (Blinky) managed to escape.

Now Pac-Man must join forces with the ghosts, Orson, Pinky, and Clyde (Blinky) to stop Erwin before he destroys both the Real World and the Spectral Realm.

Gameplay
The game features numerous differences from the previous Pac-Man World games, placing an emphasis on action and combat while still preserving most of the platforming elements from the previous entries. Pellets and fruit reappear, allowing the player to eat them for points. Additionally, there are 5 Pac-Man 25th Anniversary Statues in each level, which each grant the player 2500 points and award a bonus if all 5 statues are collected. The Butt-Bounce move is now modified so that it can only be done three times at once, but the third bounce creates a small shockwave that slightly extends the radius of the attack. The Rev-Roll is mostly the same, but can now be stopped before launching Pac-Man by pressing the jump button. Rev-Rolling can also activate machines and allow Pac-Man to call Pinky and Clyde through a Summon Point. New moves include punching, as well as acrobatic moves with poles, such as swinging and climbing. B-Doings also reappear but now only serve to launch Pac-Man into a single predetermined direction, and Pac-Dot Chains are now generated by machines that are activated using crystals with the same color. The game also features more elements of story, with a plot that is fleshed out by cutscenes and voiced character dialogue.

The power pellet is now reserved only for special sequences where Pac-Man must eat them to defeat Spectral Monsters, a special type of creature from the Spectral Realm that appears from portals and try to attack Pac-Man; this method works exactly like in previous games. In addition, new types of pellets can be eaten to try to give Pac-Man an advantage over the enemies, such as Electro-Shock Pellet, which replaces Pac-Man's punch attack with the ability to generate electricity from his hands, and the Ribbon Loop Pellet, which has Pac-Man leave a trail that can be enclosed to greatly damage enemies within.

Two sequences involve Pac-Man piloting a new Toc-Man, reimagined from the first game from being an attempt at imitating Pac-Man to now being a mecha. Toc-Man is used to defend from Erwin's forces, and has an ability to punch, as well as do a spin-based attack. The second sequence also features Clyde helming a blaster.

Accessible from the main menu is a museum where the player can look at the history of Pac-Man games, as well as play a port of the original Pac-Man game, and watch an interview with Pac-Man creator Toru Iwatani.

Development
The game started out as a similar but deeper game called Pac-Man Adventures, featuring involvement from animator Don Bluth, who had previously been hired by Namco to work on I-Ninja. Concept art from Bluth for the game included many different alien and creature designs, as well as the protagonist from the Dig Dug games and expressions for Pac-Man when he "loses control", implying a type of gameplay mechanic not seen in Pac-Man World 3. For unknown reasons, the game was scrapped and later reworked into Pac-Man World 3, with Bluth no longer involved.

Reprints
In 2008 for North America only, the PlayStation 2 versions of Pac-Man World 3, Pac-Man World 2, and Pac-Man World Rally were released in a 3-pack called Pac-Man Power Pack.

Also for North America only, the Nintendo DS version of Pac-Man World 3 was re-released as part of a "Dual Pack" bundle with Namco Museum DS on October 30, 2012.

Reception

The game received generally mixed reviews from critics and has been somewhat controversial among fans. Critics praised the inclusion of elements from the previous two games, while criticism focused on the repetition and lower difficulty.

The Nintendo DS release, in particular, was poorly received for glitches.

References

External links

 
 Pac-Man World 3 on Gamespot

2005 video games
3D platform games
GameCube games
Nintendo DS games
Pac-Man
PlayStation 2 games
PlayStation Portable games
Video games developed in the United States
Video games developed in the United Kingdom
Windows games
Xbox games
Blitz Games Studios games
Single-player video games